Vagn Bennike (6 January 1888 – 30 November 1970) was a Danish army engineer and demolitions expert. During the occupation of Denmark during World War II he worked in the Danish resistance movement in Jutland, where he was attached to the army's illegal tasks unit. In the summer of 1944 he took charge of resistance operations in Jutland, and was at times criticized by other resistance groups for the priority in operations he gave to his loyalty to the army.

On 28 April 1945, with the liberation of Denmark, he was promoted to Major General, and spent the next 8 years as Inspector General of Engineers. He was subsequently appointed in 1953 to succeed William E.Riley  as the UN overseer in charge of  monitoring the truce lines between Israel and her Arab neighbours, becoming Chief of Staff of UNTSO, the United Nations Truce Supervision Organization, a post in which he served for the period between June 1953 and August 1954. One of his first decisions, in September 1953, was to overrule his predecessor Riley's go-ahead to Israel for work on the proposed hydro-electric project from B'not Yaakov Bridge to Lake Kinneret, which ran through part of the demilitarized zone. Vagn Bennike suspended the work until multilateral negotiations could settle the dispute. 

After the Qibya massacre, he was called to testify before the United Nations Security Council in October 1953

He also wrote a foreword to his colleague Commander E.H.
Hutchison's book Violent Truce: The Arab-Israeli conflict 1951-1955.

References

External links
E H Hutchison “Violent Truce”

1888 births
1970 deaths
Danish generals
United Nations military personnel
Danish resistance members
Burials at Hellerup Cemetery